Mining City is an unincorporated community located in Butler County, Kentucky, United States. It was also known as Bank Yard and Suffock.

Geography 
The community is located along Kentucky Route 1117 in west-central Butler County, which is part of Kentucky's Western Coal Fields region. The community is one of the region 's several communities located along the Green River.

References

Unincorporated communities in Butler County, Kentucky
Unincorporated communities in Kentucky